Ashwell Springs is a  biological Site of Special Scientific Interest in Ashwell in Hertfordshire, England. The local planning authority is North Hertfordshire District Council.

The site consists of a series of freshwater springs, which form a source for the River Cam. Due to the low temperatures of the spring pools, they provide a habitat for cold water, invertebrate animals, some of which are rare. The site is particularly important for flatworms, including Crenobia alpina and the Polycelis felina. The pools are surrounded by grassland which provide shade for the water.

There is access from the High Street and by a footpath from Hodwell.

See also
List of Sites of Special Scientific Interest in Hertfordshire

References

External links
Ashwell's Water History, Ashwell Museum
Ashwell, Ashwell Parish Council

Sites of Special Scientific Interest in Hertfordshire
Sites of Special Scientific Interest notified in 1986
River Cam
Ashwell, Hertfordshire